Jean Meuvret (1901–1971) was a historian of early modern France. 
He was a tutor at the Ecole Normale Supérieure and was known in Europe and America for his pioneering studies of the French economy in the seventeenth century. His most important work, Le problème des subsistances á l'époque de Louis XIV, examines the corn economy of France during the Old Regime.
Meuvret was interested in showing how historical conditions affected different networks of exchange in an early monetary economy.

References 

 Robert William Fogel, The Escape from Hunger and Premature Death, 1700–2100 Europe, America, and the Third World, Cambridge, Cambridge University Press, 2004.
 Albert Soboul, "Jean Meuvret (1901-1971)", Revue d'histoire moderne et contemporaine, T. 19e, No. 1 (Jan. - Mar., 1972), pp. 1–5

1901 births
1971 deaths
20th-century French historians
French male non-fiction writers
20th-century French male writers